In the 1999–00 season Panathinaikos played for 41st consecutive time in Greece's top division, the Alpha Ethniki. They also competed in the UEFA Cup and the Greek Cup.

Squad

Competitions

Alpha Ethniki

Classification

UEFA Cup

First round

Second round

Third round

References

External links
 Panathinaikos FC official website

Panathinaikos F.C. seasons
Panathinaikos